The 1978 Hang Ten 400 was an endurance race for Group C Touring Cars. The event was staged at the Sandown International Motor Racing Circuit in Victoria, Australia on 10 September 1978 over a total distance of 401 km.
Cars competed in three engine capacity classes:
 3001 to 6000cc
 2001 to 3000cc
 Up to 2000cc
The event was Round 2 of the 1978 Australian Championship of Makes.

Results

Note: The above results listing is incomplete with regard to the non-finishers shown.

References

External links
 Image of the Allan Moffat Ford XC Falcon Cobra at the 1978 Hang Ten 400 Retrieved from www.flickr.com on 2 May 2009

Motorsport at Sandown
Pre-Bathurst 500